Don is a 1978 Indian Hindi-language crime action thriller film directed by Chandra Barot, starring Amitabh Bachchan, Zeenat Aman and Pran. Written by Salim–Javed, and produced by Nariman Irani, the film also features Iftekhar, Om Shivpuri, and Satyen Kappu in pivotal roles. Bachchan played dual roles, as the titular character and his lookalike simpleton. The plot revolves around Vijay, a Bombay slum-dweller who resembles the powerful criminal Don, being asked by Police Superintendent D'Silva to masquerade as Don after to the latter's death, in order to act as an informant for the police and track down the root of the criminal organization. The film features music by Kalyanji–Anandji, with lyrics by Anjaan and Indeevar.

It was the third highest-grossing Indian film of 1978, and was classified a golden jubilee by Box Office India.

The film spawned the Don franchise; Javed Akhtar's son Farhan Akhtar created a remake Don: The Chase Begins Again (2006) and its sequel Don 2 (2011), both starring Shah Rukh Khan. It also inspired several South Indian remakes, notably the Tamil film Billa (1980), a breakthrough film for Rajinikanth. Don is also known for its theme music, which was used in the American Dad! episode "Tearjerker" (2008). The intro to "Yeh Mera Dil" was sampled by the Black Eyed Peas for the song "Don't Phunk with My Heart" (2005).

Plot 

The film begins with Don (Amitabh Bachchan) as one of the most powerful criminals in Mumbai who always eludes the authorities despite being wanted in eleven countries. Led by DSP D'Silva (Iftekhar) and Inspector Verma (Satyen Kappu), the police department is working with Interpol officer R.K. Malik (Om Shivpuri) in their attempts to nab Don. Along with the police, Don makes a few other enemies through his merciless approach to running his organization. At this point, one of his henchmen Ramesh (Sharad Kumar) fearfully decides to leave the business of crime and escape from India. However, Don learns about Ramesh's decision and gets hold of him during his attempt of elopement, killing him. This introduces Don to his two new enemies; Kamini (Helen), Ramesh's fiancée, and Roma (Zeenat Aman), Ramesh's sister. Kamini seduces Don in an attempt to have the police arrest him, but her plan backfires as Don outsmarts her and the police in his escape. In the process, Don kills Kamini, too. A shattered Roma swears to seek revenge from Don for her brother and sister-in-law's deaths. She gets her hair cut short, trains herself in judo and karate, and enters Don's gang after deceiving the members into believing that she too is on the wrong side of the law. Without suspecting any ulterior motive, Don is impressed with her fighting skills and allows her to work for them all.

After several years of unsuccessful attempts, the police finally succeed in nabbing Don who, however, tricks them all and flees from the spot. During a police chase, he is badly injured by a gunshot inflicted by the police which leads to his sudden disappearance. That night, DSP D'Silva individually encounters a wounded Don hiding in his car and decides to take him into custody alive, to extract the source of the crime organisation that he relies on. While on their way to the police station, Don succumbs to his serious injuries in the car, botching DSP D'Silva's plan. 

Still wanting a chance to take down Don's gang, DSP D'Silva secretly gets Don's dead body buried in a graveyard while ensuring many people that he may still be alive. The only ones who are aware of Don's death are DSP D'Silva himself, the graveyard priest, and his followers. As luck would have it, D'Silva remembers his previous encounter with slum-dwelling simpleton and street performer Vijay (also Amitabh Bachchan), an exact doppelgänger of Don who is currently taking care of Deepu and Munni, two motherless children separated from their father. Meeting up with Vijay, DSP D'Silva reveals Don's death to him and hatches a plan to have Vijay impersonate Don, so that he can get the police to arrest the rest of the gang and find out the source of crime that they all rely on. As a startup, Vijay and DSP D'Silva stage an "accident" that lands Vijay in a hospital under police custody. This prompts Roma and Don's gang, currently led by Don's right-hand-man Narang (Kamal Kapoor) to kidnap Vijay from the hospital and take him to their hideout, allowing him to infiltrate the gang under the guise of having amnesia.

Around the same time, a poor widower Jasjit (Pran) is released from prison after being arrested by DSP D'Silva few years ago for a past robbery he was involved in along with Narang. Jasjit took the job only with the intention of using the money to save his ill wife from death, but was caught by D'Silva in the act which resulted in his wife's death. He also intends to reunite with his children Deepu and Munni who are currently being taken care of by Vijay as they went missing after Jasjit's arrest.  

As part of his mission, Vijay finds a red diary containing all the addresses and contacts of the criminals and even the evidences regarding their activities. He replaces the diary with a blank one and heads to DSP D'Silva's house to hand him over the real diary. While Vijay is climbing to D'Silva's apartment, Roma chases him and attacks him in an attempt to avenge both Ramesh and Kamini's deaths. Vijay survives the attack and tries to explain to Roma that he is not Don but she refuses to believe him. DSP D'Silva intervenes and confesses about Don's death to Roma, who apologises to Vijay and agrees to help him out in taking down the gang members. Using the diary, DSP D'Silva learns that all of the gang members are working for a notorious crime lord Vardhaan Makhija who is serving as the source of crime in Mumbai (even Don and Narang are nothing more than just middlemen reporting to Vardhaan). Despite this, there is no indication in finding out Vardhaan's identity as it remains unknown. Meanwhile, Vijay announces to the gang members that he has regained his memory after learning more and more about Don's past through the diary. 

However, things take a drastic turn when the police, acting upon Vijay's information, raid the hideout during the celebrations and DSP D'Silva, the only witness to Vijay's true identity, is shot in the crossfire while Vijay and the gang members are arrested as Inspector Verma and Malik mistake Vijay for Don. In the hospital, Vijay desperately tries to make a gravely injured DSP D'Silva confess that he is not Don. Unfortunately, DSP D'Silva dies from his serious injuries and Vijay is imprisoned. He is forced to escape from the police truck while on the way to a high-security jail, and the commotion causes Narang and the gang members to finally learn that Vijay is an imposter, just as they too escape from captivity, swearing to kill him. 

Tangled in a web of confusion where the police refuse to believe he is Vijay while the gang members realise he is indeed not Don, Vijay learns that the diary (the sole evidence to prove his innocence) is stolen by Jasjit in order to track down Deepu and Munni. He meets Vijay and Roma who team up with him. However, the trio learn that Malik himself is actually Vardhaan who captured the real R.K. Malik (Pinchoo Kapoor) and posed as the latter to cover his crime, and that Vardhaan was the one who had murdered DSP D'Silva during the raid-up and had already exposed Roma's identity to the gang members, before having them kidnap Deepu and Munni so that the trio can surrender themselves and the diary to Vardhaan. After being captured by Vardhaan, Jasjit is reunited with Deepu and Munni and manages to escape the hideout with them, thanking Vijay for taking care of his children. 

Meeting up in the same graveyard where Don was buried, Vardhaan and his gang members who are holding Deepu and Munni hostages, have a long standoff with Vijay, Roma and Jasjit, resulting in Vardhaan grabbing the diary from Roma and throwing it in a fire. Eventually, he calls Inspector Verma and the police to the scene to have the trio and the gang members arrested so that he can get away scot-free. However, anticipating the possibility that Vardhaan would try to escape, Vijay cleverly reveals that the diary that he had thrown in the fire was actually the blank one that he had switched, just as he hands over the real diary to Verma, exposing Vardhaan's identity and occupation to the police. Eventually, Vardhaan and the gang members are arrested and sent to prison for their crimes while all charges against Vijay are dropped. The film ends with Vijay, Roma, Jasjit, Deepu and Munni happily walking away from the police station, satisfied that they took down Vardhaan and his gang members for good.

Cast 

 Amitabh Bachchan in a dual role as 
 Vijay
 Don
 Zeenat Aman as Roma
 Pran as Jasjit ("JJ")
 Iftekhar as DSP D'Silva
 Om Shivpuri as Vardhaan / the fake R. K. Malik
 Satyen Kappu as Inspector Verma, DSP D'Silva's junior 
 P. Jairaj as Dayal
 Kamal Kapoor as Narang, Vardhaan's right-hand man
 Arpana Choudhary as Anita, Don's girlfriend
 Helen as Kamini, Ramesh's fiancée
 Shetty as Shakaal, Don's gang member 
 Mac Mohan as Mac, Don's gang member
 Yusuf Khan as Vikram, Don's gang member
 Pinchoo Kapoor as the real R. K. Malik, Interpol officer
 Sharad Kumar as Ramesh, Roma's brother
 Baby Bilkish as Munni, Jasjit's daughter
 Mastar Alankar as Dipu, Jasjit's son

Production
Producer and cinematographer Nariman Irani was in a financial mess when his film Zindagi Zindagi (1972), starring Sunil Dutt flopped. He was in debt for Rs 1.2 million and couldn't pay the money off on a cinematographer's salary. When he was doing the cinematography for Manoj Kumar's major hit Roti Kapada Aur Makaan (1974), the film's cast (Amitabh Bachchan, Zeenat Aman, Pran) and crew (assistant director Chandra Barot) decided to help him out. They all recommended that he produce another film and that they would participate in its production. They all approached scriptwriting duo Salim–Javed (Salim Khan and Javed Akhtar), who gave them an untitled script that had already been rejected by the entire industry. The cinematographer Nariman Irani, while working on Chhailla Babu, decided to borrow most of the plot of Chhailla Babu and shared a modified story idea with Chandra Barot, who made the new modified story as the film Don (1978). The script had a character named Don. Bachchan would play Don, and Barot would direct the film. Aman and Pran would play key roles in the film.

The film took three-and-a-half years to complete. Before filming was completed, producer Irani died from an accident on the set of another film he was working on. Barot faced budget restraints but received aid. Barot showed the film to his mentor Manoj Kumar, who felt that the film was too tight and needed a song in the midst of the action-filled film, and so "Khaike Paan Banaraswala" was added into the film. Don was released without any promotion on 12 May 1978 and was declared a flop the first week. Within a week after an adding the song "Khaike Paan Banaraswala", the song by itself became a big hit, and by word of mouth spread, so by the second week, the film's fortunes were reversed, and the film was declared a blockbuster. The profits from the film were given to Irani's widow to settle her husband's debts.

The hit-song "Khaike Pan Banaraswala" sung by Kishore Kumar was choreographed by P. L. Raj.

Don was produced on a budget of 70lakh ($860,000). Adjusted for inflation, its budget is equivalent to $ million (22crore) in 2016.

Soundtrack

The soundtrack of the film has been composed by the duo Kalyanji–Anandji, while the lyrics were written by Anjaan and Indeevar.

According to film music expert Rajesh Subramanian, the song "Khaike Paan Banaraswala" was composed by Babla, the younger brother of a famous music director Kalyanji–Anandji.

Kishore Kumar and Asha Bhosle received accolades at filmfare for the tracks "Khaike Paan Banaraswala" and "Yeh Mera Dil" respectively, both of which have also been remixed in the remake.

Box office
At the Indian box office, the film grossed 7crore ($8.6million). Adjusted for inflation, its box office gross is equivalent to $ million (186crore) in 2016.

Awards

Legacy and influence

Don series

The film was remade in 2006 as Don starring Shah Rukh Khan in the lead role of Don and Vijay, Priyanka Chopra as Roma, Arjun Rampal as Jasjit, Boman Irani as D'Silva, and Om Puri as Malik. It was directed by Farhan Akhtar. With some changes in the script, the film proved to be one of the highest-grossing films of the year. A sequel to that film, Don 2, was released on 23 December 2011.

Remakes in other languages
 Don was first remade in 1979 in Telugu as Yugandhar, starring NTR, Jayasudha and Jayamalini.
It was also remade in 1980 in Tamil as Billa, starring Rajinikanth.  Helen, who played Kamini in the original Hindi film  Don (1978), repeated her role in this remake. Billa was a breakthrough film for Rajinikanth, establishing him as the top star of South Indian cinema.
 In 1986, the movie was remade in Malayalam as Shobaraj, starring Mohanlal and Madhavi.
 In 1991, the movie was remade into a Punjabi language Pakistani movie titled Cobra, starring Sultan Rahi and Nadira.
 The 2006 Hindi remake starring Shah Rukh Khan, titled Don, inspired the Tamil directors who made the Ajith Kumar starrer Billa — a remake of the same-titled Rajinikanth film.
In 2009, a second Telugu remake titled Billa was released, starring Prabhas, Anushka Shetty, Namitha and Krishnam Raju, and Jayasudha in a different role than the one she played in Yugandhar. This film used the same title as the Tamil remakes.
 Billa II (2012) is a Tamil film starring Ajith and a prequel to Billa (2007).

Music
A sample from the song "Yeh Mera Dil" was used by The Black Eyed Peas for their hit song "Don't Phunk with My Heart" in 2005. The song won the Black Eyed Peas their first Grammy Award for Best Rap Performance by a Duo or Group, while the composers for "Yeh Mera Dil", Kalyanji–Anandji, were awarded the BMI Award for being the originators of the melodies used in "Don't Phunk with My Heart."

The third season American Dad! episode "Tearjerker" (2008) uses the 1978 Don theme music in its intro sequence.

The third episode of the Marvel Studios television series Ms. Marvel features "Yeh Mera Dil" in a wedding dance sequence.

References

External links
 
 

1978 films
1970s Hindi-language films
Films set in Mumbai
Films about organised crime in India
1970s crime action films
1970s action thriller films
1970s crime thriller films
Films scored by Kalyanji Anandji
Hindi films remade in other languages
Indian action thriller films
Indian crime action films
Indian crime thriller films
Films with screenplays by Salim–Javed
1970s Urdu-language films
Urdu films remade in other languages
Girls with guns films
Films shot in Mumbai
1970s masala films
Films about lookalikes